East Kennebago Mountain is a trailless mountain located in Franklin County, Maine. 
East Kennebago Mtn. is a monadnock, flanked by its spurs: Tim Mountain to the north, Black Spur to the west, and Blackcat Mountain to the southwest.

The southeast side of East Kennebago Mountain drains into the South Branch of the Dead River, thence into Flagstaff Lake, the Dead River, and the Kennebec River, which drains into the Gulf of Maine.
The northeast end of East Kennebago drains into Cherry Run, thence into the South Branch of the Dead River.
The southwest end of East Kennebago drains into Kennebago Lake, thence into the Kennebago River, Cupsuptic Lake, through a series of lakes into the Rapid River and Umbagog Lake, the source of the Androscoggin River, which drains into Merrymeeting Bay, the estuary of the Kennebec River.
The northwest side of East Kennebago drains into Big Sag Brook, thence into Kennebago Lake.

References

See also 
 List of mountains in Maine
 New England Hundred Highest

Mountains of Franklin County, Maine
New England Hundred Highest
Mountains of Maine